Dame is an honorific title and the feminine form of address for the honour of damehood in many Christian chivalric orders, as well as the British honours system and those of several other Commonwealth realms, such as Australia and New Zealand, with the masculine form of address being Sir. It is the female equivalent for knighthood, which is traditionally granted to males. Dame is also style used by baronetesses in their own right.

A woman appointed to the grades of the Dame Commander or Dame Grand Cross of the Order of Saint John, Equestrian Order of the Holy Sepulchre, Most Honourable Order of the Bath, the Most Distinguished Order of Saint Michael and Saint George, the Royal Victorian Order, or the Most Excellent Order of the British Empire becomes a dame. A Central European order in which female members receive the rank of Dame is the Imperial and Royal Order of Saint George. Since there is no female equivalent to a Knight Bachelor, women are always appointed to an order of chivalry. Women who are appointed to the Most Noble Order of the Garter or the Most Ancient and Most Noble Order of the Thistle are given the title of Lady rather than Dame.

History
The Order of the Ermine, founded by John V, Duke of Brittany in 1381, was the first order of chivalry to accept women; however, female knights existed for centuries in many places in the world prior to this. Like their male counterparts, they were distinguished by the flying of coloured banners and generally bore a coat of arms.

One woman who participated in tournaments was Joane Agnes Hotot (born 1378), but she was not the only one. Additionally, women adopted certain forms of regalia which became closely associated with the status of knighthood.

Unlike the male knights, it was virtually unimaginable to see women taking part in medieval battles or commanding battalions of soldiers, but there are exceptions. Joan of Arc is the most famous.  Some wore armour, others commanded troops, and some were members of an official order of chivalry. One woman to wear full armour into battle was the Duchess Gaita of Lombardy (also called Sikelgaita), who rode beside her Norman mercenary husband, Robert Guiscard. She was a knight in her own right. Another was Petronilla de Grandmesnil, Countess of Leicester; wearing a mail hauberk with a sword and a shield, she defended her lands from Henry II of England. She and her husband participated in the rebellion in 1173 against King Henry II. However this does not mean that they were officially knighted the way men were.

Formerly, a knight's wife was given the title of "Dame" before her name, but this usage was replaced by "Lady" during the 17th century.

The title of dame as the official equivalent of knight was introduced in 1917 with the introduction of the Order of the British Empire, and was subsequently extended to the Royal Victorian Order in 1936, the Order of St Michael and St George, and finally the Order of the Bath in 1971.

The youngest person to be appointed a dame was sailor Ellen MacArthur at the age of 28.
The oldest had been actress Gwen Ffrangcon-Davies at the age of 100, until Olivia de Havilland was appointed two weeks before her 101st birthday.

Several high-profile figures have declined the honour. 

The prefix is used with the holder's given name or full name, but never with the surname alone; this follows the same usage customs as 'Sir'.

Notes

External links

Dames
Titles
Women's social titles
British honours system
Styles (forms of address)